Team IG–Sigma Sport was a British UCI continental cycling team.

Profile
Team IG–Sigma Sport are sponsored by the IG Group, a financial derivatives company, and Sigma Sport, a bicycle and triathlon retailer. The team rode senior professional events in the United Kingdom and Europe, other than the Grand Tours and UCI ProTour races.  Sigma sports was directed by Matthew Stephens.

Team IG ended their backing for the team after the 2013 season, and as the team were unable to find a new co-sponsor they were not able to continue into 2014. However Sigma Sport pledged to continue to search for a new sponsor in order to return to competition in 2015.

2013 team
As of 15 January 2013.

References

External links
 

Defunct cycling teams based in the United Kingdom
Cycling teams established in 2009
Cycling teams disestablished in 2013
UCI Continental Teams (Europe)